Willy 1er is a 2016 French comedy-drama film written and directed by Ludovic Boukherma, Zoran Boukherma, Marielle Gautier and Hugo P. Thomas. The film centres on a 50-year-old man who, after the death of his twin brother, leaves his parents' house for the first time to settle in a nearby village. The film was awarded the Prix d'Ornano-Valenti for outstanding first film at the 2016 Deauville American Film Festival.

Cast 
 Daniel Vannet as Willy / Michel
 Noémie Lvovsky as Catherine
 Romain Léger as Willy II
 Robert Follet as Willy's father
 Geneviève Plet as Willy's mother
 Eric Jacquet as José
 Alexandre Jacques as Brice
 Léa Viller as Chloé
 Catherine Lefrançois as Sandrine

References

External links 
 

2016 films
2016 comedy-drama films
2010s French-language films
French comedy-drama films
French films based on actual events
2016 directorial debut films
2010s French films